Walter Vincent McGinn Jr. (July 6, 1936 – March 31, 1977) was an American actor. He was best known for playing Louis Howe in the critically acclaimed television film Eleanor and Franklin: The White House Years (1977), for which he posthumously received a Primetime Emmy Award nomination. Some of his other notable film roles were in The Parallax View (1974), Three Days of the Condor (1975) and Bobby Deerfield (1977).

Early life and career
Born Walter Vincent McGinn Jr. in Providence, Rhode Island, on July 6, 1936. He graduated with a B.A. from the Boston University College of Fine Arts. He was married to Robyn Goodman on May 2, 1976, until his death.

McGinn made his Off-Broadway debut in the 1963 production of the play The Winter's Tale at the Delacorte Theater and Broadway debut in the 1964 play The Subject Was Roses at the Helen Hayes Theater. He later appeared on both stage and screen.

Death
McGinn died in a Los Angeles hospital from injuries sustained in an auto accident on March 31, 1977. He was 40 years old.

Filmography

Film

Television

Awards and nominations

References

External links
 
 
 
 

1936 births
1977 deaths
American male stage actors
American male television actors
American male film actors
20th-century American male actors
Male actors from Rhode Island
Actors from Providence, Rhode Island
Drama Desk Award winners
Boston University College of Fine Arts alumni
Road incident deaths in California